Crateús Esporte Clube, commonly known as Crateús, is a Brazilian football club based in Crateús, Ceará state.

History
The club was founded on February 14, 2001. They won the Campeonato Cearense Third Level in 2004 and in 2010. Crateús finished in the eleventh position in the 2012 Campeonato Cearense.

Achievements
 Campeonato Cearense Third Level:
 Winners (2): 2004, 2010

Stadium
Crateús Esporte Clube play their home games at Estádio Juvenal Melo, nicknamed Jumelão. The stadium has a maximum capacity of 4,000 people.

References

Association football clubs established in 2001
Football clubs in Ceará
2001 establishments in Brazil